Keagan Larenzo Dolly (born 22 January 1993) is a South African professional football player who plays as an attacking midfielder for Kaizer Chiefs in the Premier Soccer League and the South Africa national team. He won the Premier Soccer League Young Player of the Season award for the 2013–14 season after showing great performances and becoming a key player for Mamelodi Sundowns.

Club career

Mamelodi Sundowns
Born in Johannesburg, Gauteng, Dolly started playing football at Westbury Arsenal, then later he moved to School of Excellence where he was spotted by Mamelodi Sundowns. After impressing at their youth structures he went on to sign with Ajax Cape Town.

Ajax Cape Town
Dolly completed a move to Ajax Cape Town and this is perhaps where Dolly made a reputation for himself. During a spell at Ajax he won the Premier Soccer League Young Player award for the 2013–14 season. This triggered Sundowns to buy him back from Ajax Cape Town for their 2014–15 season, but because of many players occupying the same position as Keagan during that season, Sundowns opted to loan him back to Ajax for the player to get more playing time.

Return to Mamelodi Sundowns
Sundowns included Dolly to their squad for the 2015–16 campaign as they intended to bolster their team for the league and for the CAF champions league. Dolly with Sundows went on to win the league for the 2015–16 season, and they automatically qualified for the CAF champions league. Sundowns were eliminated by AS Vita Club in the third round of the Caf Champions league but with the turn of events AS Vita Club were eliminated in the competition due to the finding that they had used an ineligible player during the preliminary matches of the 2016 Orange CAF Champions League. Sundowns were reinstated to the competition and with the outstanding performances from Dolly and the whole team, Sundowns went on to win the competition. Dolly, Billiat and Onyango were nominated for best African Inter-Club Player of the Year (Based in Africa) of which was won by Keagan's teammate Dennis Onyango. Dolly was included in the 2016 CAF Team of the year. With outstanding performances from Dolly it eventually attracted interests from various clubs in Europe. In September 2016 it was announced that Olympiacos F.C. were interested in signing Dolly.

Contract Dispute with Mamelodi Sundowns
In November 2016, it was reported that Sundowns had taken their star midfielder to the DRC to contest a buyout clause of around €750,000 that was written into his contract, that was signed 17 months prior which Sundowns stated it was too low. The argument was that a mistake was made by Sundowns, and that they wanted it to be rectified to an amount around £1.5 million. Sundowns eventually won the case and the buyout clause was updated to £1.5 million.

Montpellier
On 26 January 2017, it was announced that Dolly had signed with Montpellier HSC. He left the club in summer 2021.

Kaizer Chiefs
Dolly returned to South Africa in July 2021, joining Kaizer Chiefs.

International career

Under-23
Keagan Dolly played for the under 23's and represented his country during the 2015 Africa U-23 Cup of Nations tournament which was held in Senegal. The tournament acted as the CAF qualifiers for the Olympic football tournament, of which South Africa qualified as the third-place country. Dolly captained the South African side during the 2016 Summer Olympics men's football tournament.

International goals
Scores and results list South Africa's goal tally first, score column indicates score after each Dolly goal.

Style of play
Dolly primarily plays as either a winger or occasionally as an attacking midfielder, he often plays as a left sided winger for both club and country. Due to his energetic pace and playmaking skills; this position allows him to shoot with his stronger foot. The diminutive left-footed player is capable of occupying any position behind the forward line. His extreme pace and close control allows him to roam into pockets of space around the pitch in the same way as Manchester United playmaker Juan Mata. Former South African playmaker Steven Pienaar had also tipped Dolly on becoming one of the best exports that South Africa has ever produced.

Personal life
Like Steven Pienaar, Dolly hails from Westbury, a largely coloured township in Johannesburg. He was educated at the prestigious Potchefstroom High School for Boys .

Honours
Mamelodi Sundowns
 Telkom Knockout: 2015
 Premier Soccer League: 2015–16
 CAF Champions League: 2016

South Africa U23
Africa U-23 Cup of Nations third place: 2015

Individual
 PSL Young Player of the Season: 2013–14
 CAF Team of the Year

References

External links

Living people
1993 births
South African soccer players
Cape Coloureds
Association football midfielders
Soccer players from Johannesburg
Ligue 1 players
Cape Town Spurs F.C. players
Mamelodi Sundowns F.C. players
Montpellier HSC players
Kaizer Chiefs F.C. players
South African expatriate soccer players
Expatriate footballers in France
2015 Africa U-23 Cup of Nations players
Footballers at the 2016 Summer Olympics
Olympic soccer players of South Africa
South Africa international soccer players